Pine Dock is a small fishing community by Lake Winnipeg in Manitoba, Canada. It had a population that was largest in the 1970s. Since this time its population has decreased. There is a small public beach and community town hall that continues to operate. During the 1970s to 1980s there was a small general store and a gas station, and an elementary school run by the Frontier School Division, however these are no longer operating. There is still a government dock and fishing station that continues to be used by local fishing industry. The next closest community is located on Matheson Island, Manitoba, that is 15 miles north of Pine Dock on Provincial Road 234, and accessed by a cable Ferry. South of Pine Dock are several recreational cottage developments including Beaver Creek Provincial Park (Manitoba), Mill Creek and Little Deer.

Demographics 

Climate

References

External links
 Community Profile

Designated places in Manitoba
Northern communities in Manitoba